Lourdes Elizabeth Ortiz Vallejos (born 1 July 1987) is a Paraguayan footballer who plays as a midfielder. She was a member of the Paraguay women's national team.

International career
Ortiz represented Paraguay at the 2006 South American U-20 Women's Championship. At senior level, she played in three Copa América Femenina editions (2006, 2010 and 2014).

International goals
Scores and results list Paraguay's goal tally first

References

External links

1987 births
Living people
Paraguayan women's footballers
Women's association football midfielders
Sportivo Luqueño players
Cerro Porteño players
Paraguay women's international footballers